The Marias River Bridge spans the Marias River near Shelby in Toole County, Montana.  It was listed on the National Register of Historic Places in 2012.

Montana's Department of Transportation is responsible for the bridge.

References

National Register of Historic Places in Toole County, Montana
Steel bridges in the United States
Road bridges on the National Register of Historic Places in Montana
Transportation in Toole County, Montana